Ryan Philip Kuehl (born January 18, 1972) is a former American football long snapper in the National Football League (NFL).

Early years
Kuehl attended Walt Whitman High School in Bethesda, Maryland, where he was a prep All-American selection as a senior.  One of Kuehl's notable high school achievements was scoring the Vikings' only playoff touchdown in nearly 20 years on a late game scoring strike from quarterback Andy Eichberg in the 1988 MD state playoff loss to the Randallstown Rams.  It was the Vikings' only score that day.

Kuehl was a four-year letterman at the University of Virginia and was named second-team All-ACC at defensive tackle (1994).

NFL career
1995: signed as free agent by the San Francisco 49ers ... released in 1996
1996: signed as free agent by the Washington Redskins ... waived 1998
1999: signed as free agent by the Cleveland Browns
2003: signed as unrestricted free agent by the New York Giants

Kuehl retired from the NFL after a ruptured Achilles' tendon during the 2007 preseason. Although he didn't play during the season, he earned a ring as a member of the Super Bowl XLII winning team.

Post-NFL career
After football, Kuehl earned an MBA from American University and joined Under Armour in 2009. As vice president of sports marketing in sponsorships, he gave Jordan Spieth a ten-year deal with the company in 2015, replacing the company's original four-year contract from 2013.

Kuehl left Under Armour in 2018.

References

External links
ESPN Profile: Ryan Kuehl

1972 births
Living people
American football long snappers
Cleveland Browns players
New York Giants players
Players of American football from Washington, D.C.
San Francisco 49ers players
Virginia Cavaliers football players
Washington Redskins players
Kogod School of Business alumni
Walt Whitman High School (Maryland) alumni